Arnljot Elgsæter (born 19 March 1944 in Kistrand) is a Norwegian physicist.

He is now a professor emeritus who held a tenured position at the Department of Physics at the Norwegian Institute of Technology (NTH) / Norwegian University of Science and Technology (NTNU) from 1974 to 2009. While at NTNU, he served twice as department chair and once as dean. He holds a master of technology in Engineering physics from NTH in 1969, and received a Ph.D. in biophysics from University of California, Berkeley in 1971, under the supervision of Daniel Branton.

Arnljot Elgsæter is a member of the Royal Norwegian Society of Sciences and Letters and the Norwegian Academy of Technological Sciences.

References

External links 
Google scholar profile

1944 births
Living people
People from Porsanger
Norwegian physicists
Norwegian Institute of Technology alumni
University of California, Berkeley alumni
Norwegian expatriates in the United States
Academic staff of the Norwegian Institute of Technology
Academic staff of the Norwegian University of Science and Technology
Royal Norwegian Society of Sciences and Letters
Members of the Norwegian Academy of Technological Sciences